Levington is a small village in the county of Suffolk, England in the East Suffolk district. The population of the parish including Stratton Hall at the 2011 Census was 259.

History
Levington has a church called St Peter's Church and a pub. It is near the large town of Ipswich and the village of Nacton. A Viking ship was once found in Levington.
Roger Bigod of Norfolk was the main tenant in chief of the manor in 1086 and it is likely that his descendants the Earls of Norfolk held the manor. The manor had 14 households in 1086 which would amount to between 56-70 people living there. Sir Robert Hitcham (1572? – 1636), Member of Parliament, Attorney-General to Anne of Denmark Queen Consort to James I, and one-time owner of Framlingham Castle was born in the village. He bequeathed the castle to Pembroke College, Cambridge, where he had been educated, on his death.

Geography
The village is widely known for the Levington Research Station, built by Fisons in 1957. The fertiliser factory of Fisons was at Bramford, west of Ipswich. The site was well known for developing Levington Compost in the 1960s.

References 

 Village of the month

Villages in Suffolk
Civil parishes in Suffolk